¡Ah qué Kiko! (Oh, that Kiko, lit. What a boy is Kiko!) is a Mexican sitcom produced by Telerey for the Imevisión network (now TV Azteca). It stars Carlos Villagrán portraying Kiko, a modified version of his character of Quico from El Chavo del Ocho and Ramón Valdés as Don Ramón.

Synopsis 
The series takes place in a small town where Don Ramón is the manager of a small grocery store called ‘La Sorpresa’ (The Surprise). Kiko is a frequent client who later starts working for him.

Cast 
Carlos Villagrán as Kiko
Ramón Valdés as Don Ramón
Sergio "El Comanche" Ramos as Don Cejudo
Beatriz Olea as Pamela
Jorge Alejandro as Toto
Dacia Arcaraz as Nena
Tito Dreinhüffer as Fito

External links

Mexican television series
Spanish-language television shows